The Belarus Athletic Federation is the governing body for the sport of athletics in Belarus. 

In 2022, World Athletics imposed sanctions against the Member Federation of Belarus because of the 2022 Russian invasion of Ukraine, and all athletes, support personnel, and officials from Belarus were excluded from all World Athletics Series events for the foreseeable future. World Athletics Council also applied sanctions on the Belarus Athletic Federation, including banning its hosting of any international or European athletics events, representation at Congress or in decisions which require Congressional votes, involvement of its personnel in programs, and accreditation to attend any World Athletics Series events.

Affiliations 
World Athletics
European Athletic Association (EAA)
Belarus Olympic Committee

National records 
The Federation maintains the Belarusian records in athletics.

References

External links 
Official webpage 
Belarus Athletic Federation. European Athletics.

Belarus
Athletics
National governing bodies for athletics